Vincė Vaidevutė Margevičienė (born 12 May 1949) is a Lithuanian biologist, political prisoner, politician and a former member of the Seimas. She was designated as the vice chairwoman of the Homeland Union in 2015.

References

1949 births
Homeland Union politicians
Living people
Kaunas University of Technology alumni
Lithuanian biologists
People from Irkutsk Oblast
Vilnius University alumni
Women members of the Seimas
Lithuanian municipal councillors
Politicians from Kaunas
21st-century Lithuanian politicians
21st-century Lithuanian women politicians
Vice-mayors of places in Lithuania
Members of the Seimas